Oderbach is a small river of Hesse, Germany. It flows into the Elbbach near Hadamar.

See also
List of rivers of Hesse

Rivers of Hesse
Rivers of the Westerwald
Rivers of Germany